Tuomola is a Finnish surname. Notable people with the surname include:

 Andrei Tuomola, Finnish swimmer
 Jussi Tuomola (born 1965), Finnish cartoonist
 Karita Tykkä (born 1976), née Tuomola, Finnish television host, actress, and model

Finnish-language surnames